The 2004 Taça de Angola was the 23rd edition of the Taça de Angola, the second most important and the top knock-out football club competition following the Girabola. Sonangol do Namibe beat Primeiro de Agosto 2-0 in the final to secure its second title.

The winner qualified to the 2005 CAF Confederation Cup.

Stadia and locations

Championship bracket
The knockout rounds were played according to the following schedule:
 June 13 - preliminary rounds
 Jun 26 - 27: Round of 16
 Aug 17 - 19: Quarter-finals
 Aug 26 - Sep 7: Semi-finals
 Nov 11: Final

Preliminary rounds

1/16 finals

Quarter-finals

Semi-finals

Final

See also
 2004 Girabola
 2005 Angola Super Cup
 2005 African Cup Winners' Cup
 2005 CAF Confederation Cup
 Sonangol do Namibe players
 Primeiro de Agosto players

External links
 profile at rsssf.com

References

Angola Cup
2004 in Angolan football
Angola